Obashevo is a rural locality (a village) in Krasnoplamenskoye Rural Settlement, Alexandrovsky District, Vladimir Oblast, Russia. The population was 202 as of 2010. There are 4 streets.

Geography 
Obashevo is located 50 km northwest of Alexandrov (the district's administrative centre) by road. Klenovka is the nearest rural locality.

References 

Rural localities in Alexandrovsky District, Vladimir Oblast